Junction Creek is a creek in southwestern Alberta. It is a tributary of the Sheep River.

See also
List of rivers of Alberta

References

Rivers of Alberta
Rivers of the Canadian Rockies